Great Britain women's national floorball team is the national team of Great Britain. At the 2001 Floorball Women's World Championship in Riga, Latvia, the team finished eighth in the B-Division.

References 

Women's national floorball teams
Floorball